Other Songs may refer to:

Other Songs (album), 1997 album by Ron Sexsmith
Other Songs (novel), 2003 novel by Jacek Dukaj